John Barkley Means, Ph.D. (born 1938) was an American professor of Liberal Arts at Temple University from 1968 to 2003. He joined the foreign language faculty at that university on completion of doctoral studies at the University of Illinois at Urbana-Champaign.  Prof. Means was founding director of the Center for  Critical Languages and, in later years, served as director of Temple University's Institute for Languages and International Studies.  Initially focusing on the development of Luso-Brazilian programs at Illinois and Temple, in the 1970s Means's professional interests broadened to include the development of non-traditional academic methodologies for the teaching of low-enrollment languages at the college/university level and, subsequently, at the secondary level as well.  Scholarly publications during his first decade at Temple University focused on Ibero-American culture, including Essays on Brazilian Literature (Simon & Schuster, 1971).  In the 1980s and '90s, Prof. Means's academic interests also incorporated United States Department of Education grant-funded adult language-acquisition research.

To this end, Prof. Means established Temple University's Critical Languages Center in 1975 and, in 1977, assumed directorship of the National Association of Self-Instructional Language Programs (NASILP), a newly developing consortium of schools providing courses in various less commonly taught languages through an auto-didactic approach to individualized instruction.  Under Means's leadership, the association expanded during the 1980s from a largely regional into a fully national association of over 125 institutions with self-accessed academic programs in more than forty foreign languages—i.e., most modern languages offered in North American secondary and higher educational institutions except Spanish, French, and German.  During this period, the association received external funding from the U.S. Department of Education and private foundations (e.g., Japan Foundation) for support of academic initiatives administered by Prof. Means at Temple University.  In 1998, after more than twenty years under Means's directorship, the NASILP secretariat was transferred to the University of Arizona.

During the 1980s and 1990s, Means remained an active figure nationally in foreign-language higher education, notably through his seminal work at NASILP and other professional organizations serving the field of foreign language teaching, especially the non-Western language areas. Prof. Means was a founding officer of the National Council of Organizations of Less Commonly Taught Languages (NCOLCTL), initially underwritten by a series of grants from the Ford Foundation, and served as the Council's Executive Secretary-Treasurer for twelve years (1989-2001).  Other activities included service to the Joint National Committee for Languages (JNCL), representing all national, regional and state foreign language organizations, and the National Council of Languages and International Studies, engaged in government lobbying efforts in support of language acquisition in American secondary and higher education.  Also during this period, Means served as a language/linguistics curriculum evaluator for the American Council on Education, and was consulting editor for foreign language textual materials with Norton Publishers, New York, NY.

Since 2003, Dr. Means is Professor Emeritus of Temple University and Executive Director Emeritus of the National Association of Self-Instructional Language Programs (NASILP). He is also a member of the University of Illinois President's Council, and is a Diamond Legion member of Pi Kappa Phi.  Biographical information is provided in the Directory of American Scholars (American Council of Learned Societies), Contemporary Authors, and Marquis Who's Who

References

University of Illinois alumni
Temple University faculty
Pi Kappa Phi
1939 births
Living people